Gymnodiscus is a genus of South African flowering plants in the sunflower family.

 Species
 Gymnodiscus capillaris (L.f.) Less. - Cape Provinces
 Gymnodiscus linearifolius DC. - Cape Provinces

References

Senecioneae
Asteraceae genera
Flora of the Cape Provinces
Endemic flora of South Africa